The 2014 British Rowing Junior Championships were the 43rd edition of the National Junior Championships, held from 19–20 July 2014 at the National Water Sports Centre in Holme Pierrepont, Nottingham. They were organised and sanctioned by British Rowing, and are open to British junior rowers.

Medal summary

References

British Rowing Junior Championships
British Rowing Junior Championships
British Rowing Junior Championships